Taumihau Tiatia (born 25 July 1991) is a Tahitian footballer who plays as a defender for A.S. Tefana in the Tahiti Ligue 1.

References

1991 births
Living people
French Polynesian footballers
Association football defenders
Tahiti international footballers
Wasquehal Football players
2016 OFC Nations Cup players